Boz Baz (also Romanized as Boz Bāz, Bozbāz, and Bozboz) is a village in Asaluyeh Rural District, Central District, Asaluyeh County, Bushehr Province, Iran. At the 2006 census, its population was 394, in 91 families.

References 

Populated places in Asaluyeh County